The Americas Zone was one of the three regional zones of the 1987 Davis Cup.

11 teams entered the Americas Zone in total, with the winner promoted to the following year's World Group. Brazil defeated Ecuador in the final and qualified for the 1988 World Group.

Participating nations

Draw

First round

Venezuela vs. Canada

Colombia vs. Uruguay

Caribbean/West Indies vs. Cuba

Quarterfinals

Ecuador vs. Bolivia

Peru vs. Canada

Uruguay vs. Brazil

Caribbean/West Indies vs. Chile

Semifinals

Canada vs. Ecuador

Chile vs. Brazil

Final

Brazil vs. Ecuador

References

External links
Davis Cup official website

Davis Cup Americas Zone
Americas